Roland Cardon (15 April 1929 – 18 August 2001) was a Belgian composer, pedagogue, flautist, clarinetist and multi-instrumentalist. He often published works under the name Guy Rodenhof.

After studies at the Ghent Conservatory, from 1955 he was a member of the long-lived band Chasseurs Ardennais in which he played solo flute. In the period 1963 to 1972 he was a lecturer in woodwind and orchestral music in the music school of Aarlen. From 1973 to 1982 he taught flute at the Music Academy in Vilvoorde. In addition, he taught at the Rijksmuziekacademie in Etterbeek in flute from 1973 to 1977. From 1974 to 1977 he was lecturer in the conducting of wind or fanfare orchestras at the Royal Conservatory of Brussels. From 1 January 1982 to 1 July 1994 he was director at the Municipal Conservatory of Ostend.

Compositions

Orchestra 
 Serenade, for strings
 Moderato
 Andante
 Allegro

Band 
 1968 Capriccio in Blue
 Ad Futurum
 Arlequino, ouverture in sonatenvorm
 Blue, sweet & swing, voor klarinettenkoor
 Childrens Symphony
 Claribel, voor klarinettenkoor
 Concertino, voor piano en harmonieorkest
 Cricket First
 Dance Party, suite
 Bossalero
 Tangentino
 Chachambo
 Salsamba
 Dear Harry
 De Engelbewaarders
 De Gilde
 Fantasia en Rondo, voor klarinettenkoor
 Go (marche)
 Goede Nacht - Tot Weerziens, voor gemengd koor en harmonieorkest
 Hello, voor harmonieorkest
 Het gulden ei
 Hooglede '78
 Intrada
 Izegem 900
 Jubilate
 La marche du souvenir
 Le Grand Manège
 Lovers Prayer, voor altsaxofoon solo en harmonieorkest
 Lullaby, voor klarinettenkoor
 Majorette-special
 Marche de la Légion Mobile
 Mauritiana
 Moods, voor klarinettenkoor
 Mozart, Weber & Co., voor klarinettenkoor
 Nuts City
 Ouverture 150, voor klarinettenkoor
 Pasticcio
 Prelude, voor klarinettenkoor
 Rondo Fantastico
 Saint-Pol sur Mer
 Serenade, voor klarinettenkoor
 The Way In
 Theme & Dance, voor klarinettenkoor
 Three Inventions, voor klarinettenkoor
 Time is over
 Vicennium

Chamber music
 Andante & Allegro Moderato, voor gitaar-ensemble
 B & J, duo voor trompet en klarinet
 Close-Up, voor slagwerk-ensemble
 Four Miniatures, voor saxofoon solo
 Introduction & Dance, voor basklarinet en piano
 Lento poco rubato
 Allegro con spirito
 Invertings, voor klarinet solo
 Lento poco rubato
 Allegro moderato
 Melopée & Dans, voor fluit en piano
 Siciliana, voor altsaxofoon en piano
 Three Shorty's, voor koperkwintet
 Allegro moderato
 Adagio
 Allegro giocoso

References

Bibliography 
 Francis Pieters: Van trompetsignaal tot muziekkapel, Kortrijk: VZW Muziek Centrum, 1981
 Wolfgang Suppan, Armin Suppan: Das Neue Lexikon des Blasmusikwesens, 4. Auflage, Freiburg-Tiengen, Blasmusikverlag Schulz GmbH, 1994, 
 Paul E. Bierley, William H. Rehrig: The heritage encyclopedia of band music : composers and their music, Westerville, Ohio: Integrity Press, 1991, 
 Norman E. Smith: March music notes, Lake Charles, La.: Program Note Press, 1986, 

Belgian composers
Male composers
Belgian flautists
Belgian clarinetists
1929 births
2001 deaths
People from Ronse
20th-century Belgian male musicians
20th-century flautists